Fes-Oujda Expressway is not an Expressway where it is free but a paying 'Motorway' linking Morocco-Algeria with Oujda-Rabat-Casablanca and Southern Morocco and came into operation on 25 July 2011. The road is designated as A2 and is an extension to the Rabat-Fes expressway but in Morocco they tend to use the descriptive name with the city-names at start and finish.

The motorway is an extension on the existing Rabat - Meknes - Fes expressway which is designated as A2 or Rabat–Fes expressway.
Work started in 2007 and originally planned opening was for 2011.

Finance
The projected costs for the construction were projected at 9125 Million Dirhams, excluding costs for buying or acquiring land. but the final costs came to 10.800 MDH, which comes to 33,44 MDH per kilometer road

The ADM signed an agreement with the Hassan II Fund for Economic and Social Development for a financial injection of the ADM of 2000 MDH in 2005 and invited external investors for participation.

The main investors are: (all in Million Dirham, unless other stated)

 BID - Islamic Bank for Development   - 1080
 FADES -Arab Fund for social and economic development - 1800
 FKDEA- Kuwait Fund for Arab and Economic Development - 900
 a fund related to the OPEC - 225
 FEMIP- European Fund Euro-Medit. Inv&Partnersh. - € 180 M
 FAD - Fonds d’Abou Dhabi  - 225

Sections

The construction is divided into ten sections:
 1 : Fès – PK 43,9 (43,9 km)
 2 : PK 43,9 – Béni Bouzert (28,1 km)
 3 : Béni Bouzert – Oued Amlil (20 km)
 4 : Oued Amlil – PK 110 (18 km)
 5 : PK 110 – Taza (17 km)
 6 : Taza – Guercif (67 km)
 7 : Guercif - Taourirt (34 km)
 8 : Taourirt – Laayoun (53 km)
 9 : Laayoun – PK 316 (35 km)
10 : PK 316 – Oujda (12 km).

Several national and international constructors work on one or more sections of the road. Most international contractors have worked/are working for ADM on other projects such as the Marrakech-Agadir expressway

Network

This stretch is an important part of the Moroccan East-West corridor and will also be a part of the so-called l’Autoroute Maghrébine which will run from Nouakchott (capital of Mauritania) all the way to Tobruk in Libya.

The road will improve the access to and from many cities along the Mediterranean coast. Another project improving transport in the North is the new railroad to the port of Nador and Spanish enclave Melilla

References and footnotes

Autoroutes in Morocco
Fez, Morocco
Oujda